The Priangan (also known as Garut) is a breed of sheep found in West Java, Indonesia. The breed is used primarily for ram fighting and meat. It is a variety of the Javanese Thin-tailed. Africander and Merino breeding may have been introduced in the 19th century.

Characteristics
They are usually black or pied, occasionally individuals will be gray or tan. Rams are horned and ewes are polled (hornless). Individuals often lack external ears. The rams are selected for size, horn size, and for fighting ability.

References

Sheep breeds
Sheep breeds originating in Indonesia